The Tauranga Volcanic Centre is a geologic region in New Zealand's Bay of Plenty. It extends from the southern end of Waihi Beach and from the old volcanoes of the Coromandel Peninsula that make up the northern part of the Kaimai Range, towards the Taupō Volcanic Zone.

Geology

The Tauranga Volcanic Centre is at the intersection of the Hauraki and Taupō Rifts and was active during the period of tectonic transition from 2.95 to 1.9 million years ago when major volcanism moved south in Zealandia from the Coromandel Volcanic Zone. Part of it to the north west is sometimes defined separately in the literature as the Kaimai Volcanic Centre but this now seems an artificial distinction as the activity and volcanic rock types over lap in time and type. For example the Waiteariki Formation is ignimbrite whose associated tephra must almost certainly have come from a now buried super volcano event at the north eastern margins of the old Taupō Rift and it makes up much of the southern Kaimai Range where not covered by younger rhyolite. The Omanawa Caldera is inferred by an area of magnetic anomaly that exists to the north-west of the Rotorua Caldera, and this postulated feature buried perhaps under over a hundred meters of Mamaku ignimbrite from the Rotorua Caldera defines the southern portion of the Centre 

The Waiteariki ignimbrite erupted 2.1 million years ago. but there are at least eight other large eruptions that occurred in the Tauranga Volcanic Centre in its period of activity. Along with the eroded andesitic stratovolcano that resulted in the  Otawa Formation at least 17 rhyolite-rhyodacite lava dome complexes contribute to what has been called the Minden rhyolite subgroup. To add complexity like presently found in currently active caldera complexes in the Taupō Volcanic Zone is the distinct Papamoa ignimbrite formations (dated to 2.21 ± 0.1 million years ago) and a small basalt lava flow on Matakana Island (dated to 2.7 ± 0.1 million years ago). Mount Maunganui that forms one of the heads of the main entrance to Tauranga Harbour erupted 2.35 ± 0.06 million years ago and is the most recognised volcano of the Centre but other volcanoes have been used as Pās by the Māori.

The most northern Bowentown dome is assigned to the Centre tentatively which has the advantage of a possible separation of about 2 million years in known activity of the Coromandel Volcanic Zone to its north from that of the Tauranga Volcanic Centre. Minden Peak may have erupted most recently of all the volcanoes in the Centre.

Relations to other volcanic activity
At the same approximate time the Centre was active to its west in Zealandia the Alexandra Volcanic Group was active.

References

Rift volcanoes
Taupō Volcanic Zone
Supervolcanoes
VEI-7 volcanoes
Pleistocene calderas
Calderas of New Zealand
Volcanoes of the Bay of Plenty Region
Stratovolcanoes of New Zealand
Volcanism of New Zealand